False Priest is the tenth full-length studio album by indie-pop group of Montreal, released on September 14, 2010 by Polyvinyl Records on CD, digital, and 180-gram vinyl in both red and black. In addition, Joyful Noise Recordings released a limited-edition cassette version of the album, making False Priest the first of Montreal album ever released on cassette.

Singles
On June 25, 2010, the first single, "Coquet Coquette", was released as a free mp3, along with album art and pre-order information on the band's website. On July 7, 2010, the second single, "Hydra Fancies", was released on Somekindofawesome.com

Sound
Speaking with Pitchfork, front man Kevin Barnes said of the album's sound, "there's a thick R&B influence, so it's cool that we have a lot of deep low end. There's a lot of very dancey, very funky songs... We try to have these 'holy fuck' moments where you're really having your mind blown, especially if you're listening to it on headphones."

The album also features appearances by Janelle Monáe and Solange Knowles, and marks the return of organic instruments such as live drums, strings and pianos.

Track listing

Charts

References

External links
 

Of Montreal albums
2010 albums
Polyvinyl Record Co. albums
Albums produced by Jon Brion